Todd Woodbridge defeated Greg Rusedski 6–4, 6–2 to win the 1995 International Tennis Championships singles event. Luiz Mattar was the champion but did not defend his title.

Seeds

  Magnus Larsson (first round)
  Thomas Enqvist (quarterfinals)
  David Wheaton (second round)
  Mark Woodforde (semifinals)
  Brett Steven (quarterfinals)
 / Greg Rusedski (final)
  Jonathan Stark (second round)
  Javier Frana (semifinals)

Draw

Finals

Section 1

Section 2

External links
 1995 International Tennis Championships draw

Singles
Delray Beach Open